Diatta may refer to:

People:

Adama Diatta (born 1988), male freestyle wrestler from Senegal
Aline Sitoe Diatta (1920–1944), Senegalese hero of the resistance to French Colonialism
Astou Ndiaye-Diatta (born 1973), retired Senegalese women's basketball player
Emile Diatta, Senegalese politician
Krépin Diatta (born 1999), Senegalese footballer
Lamine Diatta (born 1975), Senegalese footballer

Places:

Cité Aline Sitoe Diatta, neighborhood in west central Dakar, Senegal
Stade Aline Sitoe Diatta, multi-use stadium in Ziguinchor, Senegal